Mission Nuestra Señora del Rosario was established in November 1754 by Spanish Franciscan missionary Father Juan de Dios Camberos to bring Christianity to the indigenous Karankawa people. At its peak, the mission owned a herd of 5,000 cattle, but mismanagement, lack of administrative support and resistance from the Karankawa led to the gradual decline of the mission.

At the mission, the Karankawa were expected to adhere to a schedule of religious instruction, technical education and manual labor, however, few Karankawa would abandon their religion and culture and left the mission.

The architectural details of Mission Rosario are lost, but archaeologists believe the building consisted of a chapel, sacristy, bell tower and residence. Soldiers from nearby Presidio La Bahía most likely guarded the mission to protect it from threats.

References

Rosario
National Register of Historic Places in Goliad County, Texas
Properties of religious function on the National Register of Historic Places in Texas
1754 establishments in Texas